The Kalkines warning is an advisement of rights usually administered by United States federal government agents to federal employees and contractors in internal investigations.  The Kalkines warning compels subjects to make statements or face disciplinary action up to, and including, dismissal, but also provides suspects with criminal immunity for their statements.  It was promulgated by the U.S. Court of Federal Claims in Kalkines v. United States. In that case, a federal employee was fired for not cooperating with an internal investigation.  The Court of Claims found that the employee had not been sufficiently advised of his immunity to criminal prosecution, nor sufficiently warned that he would be fired if he refused to cooperate.

A typical Kalkines warning (exact wording varies between federal investigative agencies) may read as follows:
You are being questioned as part of an internal and/or administrative investigation.  You will be asked a number of specific questions concerning your official duties, and you must answer these questions to the best of your ability.  Failure to answer completely and truthfully may result in disciplinary action, including dismissal.  Your answers and any information derived from them may be used against you in administrative proceedings. However, neither your answers nor any information derived from them may be used against you in criminal proceedings, except if you knowingly and willfully make false statements.

The Kalkines warning helps to ensure an employee's Constitutional rights, while also helping federal agents effectively conduct internal and administrative investigations.

See also 

 Garrity warning
 Miranda warning

References

Further reading
 "Interrogating Government Employees." Steve Knerly & Jenna Solari. FLETC (Resources-Legal Resources-Podcasts-Self Incrimination Roadmap). https://www.fletc.gov/audio/interrogating-government-employees-mp3
 Federal Law Enforcement Training Center Reference Book.  U.S. Department of Homeland Security, 2008.
 Deputy Attorney General Fisher Memorandum on Garrity and Kalkines Warnings.  U.S. Department of Justice, 2006.
 Deputy Attorney General Wray Memorandum on Office of Inspector General Investigations.  U.S. Department of Justice, 2005.

Law enforcement in the United States